Bela Pratapgarh is a town and a municipal board in Pratapgarh district  in the state of Uttar Pradesh, India.

Demographics
 India census, Bela Pratapgarh had a population of 71,835. Males constitute 53% of the population and females 47%. Bela Pratapgarh has an average literacy rate of 73%, higher than the national average of 59.5%; with 57% of the males and 43% of females literate. 13% of the population is under 6 years of age. Bela Pratapgarh is famous for its Amla Products i.e. Jelly, Murabba, Ladoo, and Amla Barfi.

References

External links
 Official Website

Cities and towns in Pratapgarh district, Uttar Pradesh